Natanas Žebrauskas (born 18 February 2002) is a Lithuanian international footballer who plays for Greuther Fürth.

Club career 
Growing through the youth ranks of Banga Gargždai, in his Lithuanian hometown, before joining the FC Nürnberg academy in 2018. He however made the move to another German club in the summer of 2022, joining Greuther Fürth, first playing playing with its reserve team.

Natanas Žebrauskas made his professional debut for SpVgg Greuther Fürth on 11 September 2022, coming on as a substitute during the 2–1 away 2. Bundesliga loss to Magdeburg.

International career 
Already an under-19 and under-21 international with Lithuania, Natanas Žebrauskas was first called to the senior team in May 2022, whist still playing for the U21 the following month.

He made his international debut for Lithuania senior team on 25 September 2022, replacing Dominykas Barauskas just before half-time, during a 1–0 Nations league away loss to Luxembourg.

References

External links

2002 births
Living people
Association football defenders
Lithuanian footballers
Lithuania youth international footballers
Lithuania under-21 international footballers
Lithuania international footballers
People from Gargždai
SpVgg Greuther Fürth players
SpVgg Greuther Fürth II players
2. Bundesliga players
Regionalliga players